The 1971 Hamilton Tiger-Cats season was the 14th season for the team in the Canadian Football League and their 22nd overall. The Tiger-Cats finished in 2nd place in the Eastern Conference with a 7–7 record, but lost the Eastern Finals to the Toronto Argonauts. On September 6, 1971, Joe Zuger and Dave Fleming set a franchise record with the longest single play passing yard, a 108-yard passing play against the Argonauts. Tony Gabriel's rookie season was with Hamilton in 1971, where he caught 20 passes for 285 yards.

Roster

Regular season

Season standings

Season schedule

Post-season

Awards and honours
Garney Henley, CFL All-Star
Leonard P. Back was elected into the Canadian Football Hall of Fame as a Builder, on November 25, 1971.
Hal Patterson was elected into the Canadian Football Hall of Fame as a Player, on November 25, 1971

References

Hamilton Tiger-cats Season, 1971
Hamilton Tiger-Cats seasons